Kalat-e Mahmak (also Romanized as Kalāt-e Maḩmak) is a village in Bondar Rural District, Senderk District, Minab County, Hormozgan Province, Iran. At the 2006 census, its population was 7, in 4 families.

References 

Populated places in Minab County